Vania may refer to:
 Vania (caste), a social group of India
 Vania (foram), a genus of fossil foraminifers
 Vania (plant), a genus of plants in the family Brassicaceae
 Vânia, or Vania, a given name (including a list of people with the name)
 Vania, an alternative spelling of the given names Vanja and Vanya
 Cyclone Vania, a tropical storm

See also 
 
 Vanniar, a social group of India
 Wania